Claudio Rangoni (26 September 1559 – 2 September 1621) was a Roman Catholic prelate who served as Bishop of Reggio Emilia (1592–1606)
and Apostolic Nuncio to Poland (1598–1606).

Biography
Claudio Rangoni was born in Modena, Italy on 26 September 1559.
On 16 December 1592, he was appointed during the papacy of Pope Clement VIII as Bishop of Reggio Emilia. 
On 10 January 1593, he was consecrated bishop by Girolamo Bernerio, Bishop of Ascoli Piceno, with Giovanni Domenico Marcot, Archbishop of Split, and Feliciano Ninguarda, Bishop of Como, serving as co-consecrators. 
On 20 October 1598, he was appointed during the papacy of Pope Clement VIII as Apostolic Nuncio to Poland. 
He served as Bishop of Reggio Emilia and Apostolic Nuncio to Poland until his resignation on 16 September 1606. 
He died on 2 September 1621.

Episcopal succession
While bishop, he was the principal consecrator of:
Wawrzyniec Gembicki, Bishop of Chelmno (1601); 
Jerzy Zamoyski, Bishop of Chełm (1601);
Simon Rudnicki, Bishop of Warmia (1605);

and the principal co-consecrator of:
Antonio Seneca, Bishop of Anagni (1607).

References

External links and additional sources
 (for Chronology of Bishops) 
 (for Chronology of Bishops) 
 (for Chronology of Bishops) 
 (for Chronology of Bishops) 

16th-century Italian Roman Catholic bishops
17th-century Italian Roman Catholic bishops
Bishops appointed by Pope Clement VIII
1559 births
1621 deaths